Peter Gill (died 8 October 2021) was a Pakistani politician who was elected member for the Provincial Assembly of Punjab.

Political career
He was elected to Provincial Assembly of Punjab on a reserved seat for minorities in 2018 Pakistani general election representing Pakistan Tehreek-e-Insaf.

References

20th-century births
2021 deaths
Pakistan Tehreek-e-Insaf politicians
Politicians from Punjab, Pakistan
Punjab MPAs 2018–2023
Pakistani Christians
Punjabi people
Year of birth missing